Tung, Tung Politisk Rock (Heavy, Heavy Political Rock) is the debut album by Norwegian band Black Debbath.

Track listing

Personnel
Egil Hegerberg (vocals, bass, synth)
Aslag Guttormsgaard (vocals, guitar, bass on track 5) 
Lars Lønning (vocals, guitar)
Ole-Petter Andreassen (drums)
Per Bertrand Aanonsen (session drummer)
Vibeke Saugestad (women's choir)
Marius Kristiansen (men's choir)

External links
Album on official website
Black Debbath official website
Duplex Records website

Black Debbath albums
1999 debut albums